The 2017 Afghan Premier League was the sixth season of Afghan Premier League, the Afghan league for association football clubs, since its establishment in 2012. Shaheen Asmayee were the champions of the season.

Teams
The following eight teams, which represent the country's eight main regions, will participate in the 2017 Afghan Premier League.
De Abasin Sape
De Maiwand Atalan
De Spin Ghar Bazan
Mawjhal Amu
Oqaban Hindukush
Shaheen Asmayee
Simorgh Alborz
Toofaan Harirod

Group A

Group B

Semi finals

First leg

Second leg

3rd place final

Final

References

External links

Afghan Premier League seasons
Afghan
2017 in Afghan football